Kadyrovo (Qäźer) is a rural locality (a village) in Rukhtinsky Selsoviet, Duvansky District, Bashkortostan, Russia. The population was 400 as of 2010. There are 6 streets.

Geography 
Kadyrovo is located 26 km south of Mesyagutovo (the district's administrative centre) by road. Yelanysh is the nearest rural locality.

References 

Rural localities in Duvansky District